Bagherabad or Baqerabad or Bagher Abad may refer to:

Alborz Province

Ardabil Province
Baqarabad, Ardabil, a village in Ardabil County

Fars Province
Baqerabad, Abadeh, a village in Abadeh County
Baqerabad, Abadeh Tashk, a village in Neyriz County
Baqerabad, Poshtkuh, a village in Neyriz County
Baqerabad, Sepidan, a village in Sepidan County
Baqerabad, Hamaijan, a village in Sepidan County

Golestan Province
Baqerabad, Aliabad, a village in Aliabad County
Baqerabad, Minudasht, a village in Minudasht County
Baqerabad, Ramian, a village in Ramian County

Hamadan Province
Baqerabad, Hamadan, a village in Tuyserkan County

Ilam Province

Isfahan Province
Baqerabad, Ardestan, a village in Ardestan County
Baqerabad, Zavareh, a village in Ardestan County
Baqerabad, Isfahan, a village in Isfahan County

Kerman Province
Baqerabad, Bardsir, a village in Bardsir County
Baqerabad, Jiroft, a village in Jiroft County
Baqerabad-e Tabatabayi, a village in Jiroft County
Baqerabad 2, a village in Kerman County
Baqerabad-e Rig, a village in Kerman County
Baqerabad, Rud Ab, a village in Narmashir County
Baqerabad, Rafsanjan, a village in Rafsanjan County
Baqerabad, Rigan, a village in Rigan County

Kermanshah Province
Baqerabad, Eslamabad-e Gharb, a village in Eslamabad-e Gharb County
Baqerabad-e Olya, a village in Eslamabad-e Gharb County
Baqerabad-e Sofla, a village in Eslamabad-e Gharb County
Baqerabad, Harsin, a village in Harsin County
Baqerabad, Kermanshah, a village in Kermanshah County
Baqerabad Meyanrud, a village in Kermanshah County
Baqerabad, Sonqor, a village in Sonqor County
Baqerabad, alternate name of Sameleh, a village in Sonqor County

Khuzestan Province
Baqerabad, Khuzestan, a village in Andika County

Kurdistan Province
Baqerabad, Bijar, a village in Bijar County
Baqerabad, Divandarreh, a village in Divandarreh County

Lorestan Province
Baqerabad, Lorestan, a village in Aligudarz County

Markazi Province
Baqerabad, Mahallat, a village in Mahallat County
Baqerabad, Shazand, a village in Shazand County
Baqerabad Rural District, in Mahallat County

Qazvin Province
Baqerabad, Dashtabi, a village in Qazvin Province, Iran
Baqerabad-e Kord, a village in Qazvin Province, Iran
Baqerabad-e Tork, a village in Qazvin Province, Iran

Qom Province
Baqerabad, Qom, a village in Qom Province, Iran
Baqerabad, Jafarabad, a village in Qom Province, Iran

Razavi Khorasan Province
Baqerabad, Davarzan, a village in Davarzan County

Semnan Province

Sistan and Baluchestan Province
Baqerabad, Dalgan, a village in Dalgan County
Baqerabad, Sistan and Baluchestan, a village in Hirmand County

Tehran Province
Baqerabad, former name of Baqershahr, a city in Tehran Province, Iran

Yazd Province
Bagherabad, Bafgh, a village in Bafgh County